All in Good Time is the debut album of American country music artist Marcus Hummon. Released in late 1995 on Columbia Records Nashville, it produced one chart hit for him on the Billboard country charts in "God's Country, USA", which peaked at number 73.

Content
Three of this album's tracks were later recorded by other artists: "Honky Tonk Mona Lisa" was recorded in 1995 by Doug Stone on his 1995 album Faith in Me, Faith in You, and by Neal McCoy on his 2003 album The Luckiest Man in the World. "Bless the Broken Road" was originally recorded by Nitty Gritty Dirt Band on their 1994 album Acoustic, and Hummon's version features a backing vocal from band member Jeff Hanna. This song was later recorded by Melodie Crittenden (1998), Geoff Moore, Sons of the Desert (both 1999), Rascal Flatts (2004), and Selah (2005); Crittenden, Rascal Flatts, and Selah all released their versions as singles. "One of These Days" was later recorded by Tim McGraw for his 1997 album Everywhere, from which it was released as a single.

Critical reception
Michael McCall, in his review for New Country magazine, gave the album three stars out of five. McCall said that the album did not have a traditionally country sound but had mostly strong lyrics and "extravagantly musical" arrangements. His review also cited "Bless the Broken Road" as a standout track, but called "God's Country, USA" the album's "major clunker."

Track listing
"Hittin' the Road" (Marcus Hummon) – 3:19
"God's Country, USA" (Hummon, Thomas "Butch" Curry) – 4:16
"One of These Days" (Hummon, Monty Powell, Kip Raines) – 4:40
"Honky Tonk Mona Lisa" (Hummon, Darrell Scott) – 3:25
"The Next Step" (Hummon, Kent Blazy, Sharon Blazy) – 3:16
"I Do" (Hummon, Powell, Raines) – 3:36
"Virginia Reelin'" (Hummon, Eric Silver) – 3:16
"Somebody's Leaving" (Hummon, Randy Boudreaux) – 3:20
"Bless the Broken Road" (Hummon, Bobby Boyd, Jeff Hanna) – 4:09
"As the Crow Flies" (Hummon, Powell, Silver) – 3:39
"Bridges over Blue" (Hummon, Silver) – 4:10
"All in Good Time" (Hummon) – 3:51

Personnel
Compiled from liner notes.
 Matraca Berg — background vocals
 Larry Byrom — electric guitar
 George Cocchini — electric guitar
 Scott Crago — percussion, prayer drum
 Rob Hajacos — fiddle, violin, five-string violin
 Jeff Hanna — background vocals
 Marcus Hummon — acoustic guitar, electric guitar, banjo, mandolin, lead and background vocals
 Sarah Hummon-Stevens — background vocals
 George Marinelli — electric guitar
 Jerry Dale McFadden — organ
 Mark Prentice — bass guitar, fretless bass
 Kip Raines — drums, background vocals
 Buck Reed — pedal steel guitar
 Jeffery Roach — piano, organ, pump organ
 Tom Roady — percussion
 Chris Rodriguez — background vocals
 Matt Rollings — piano
 Darrell Scott — Dobro, pedal steel guitar, acoustic guitar, high-strung guitar, background vocals
 Eric Silver — bass guitar, fiddle, mandolin, acoustic guitar
 Charlie White — electric guitar, acoustic guitar
 Dennis Wilson — background vocals
 Curtis Wright — background vocals
 Curtis Young — background vocals

References

External links
[ All in Good Time] at Allmusic

1995 debut albums
Columbia Records albums
Marcus Hummon albums